Irving W. Twiford (February 2, 1898 – December 9, 1988) was an American politician. He served as a Democratic member of the Wyoming House of Representatives.

Life and career 
Twiford was born in Oshkosh, Nebraska, the son of Jennie and John Twiford. He moved to Moorcroft, Wyoming in 1931.

In 1951, Twiford was elected to the Wyoming House of Representatives, representing Crook County, Wyoming.
He served on the Agriculture and Education committees.

Twiford died in December 1988 in Wheatland, Wyoming, at the age of 90. He was buried in Horseshoe Cemetery.

References 

1898 births
1988 deaths
Democratic Party members of the Wyoming House of Representatives
20th-century American politicians
Burials in Wyoming